In baseball, a switch hitter is a player who bats both right-handed and left-handed, usually right-handed against left-handed pitchers and left-handed against right-handed pitchers.

Characteristics
Right-handed batters generally hit better against left-handed pitchers and vice versa. Most curveballs break away from batters hitting from the same side as the opposing pitcher, making them harder to hit with the barrel (or "sweet spot") of the bat. Additionally, the pitcher's release is farther from the batter's center of vision. In switch-pitcher Pat Venditte's words, "If I'm pitching right-handed and they're hitting right-handed, it's tougher for them to see. And then, your breaking pitches are going away from their barrel rather than into their barrel." Even so, many switch-hitters perform better from one side of the plate than the other.

Numerous switch-hitters have achieved a higher batting average on one side of the plate but hit with more power from the other. For instance, New York Yankees great Mickey Mantle always considered himself a better right-handed hitter, but hit home runs at a higher rate from the left side of the plate. However, many of Mantle's left-handed home runs were struck at Yankee Stadium, a park notorious for being very friendly to left-handed power hitters due to its short right field porch, and Mantle batted left-handed much more often than right-handed, simply because there have always been more right-handed than left-handed pitchers. Mantle's longest home run, a 565-foot clout in 1953 at Washington's Griffith Stadium, came batting right-handed.

Most switch-hitters have been right-handed throwers, but there have been several notable switch-hitters who threw left-handed, including Cool Papa Bell, Lance Berkman, Dave Collins, Doug Dascenzo, Mitch Webster, Wes Parker, Melky Cabrera, Nick Swisher, Justin Smoak, David Segui, Daniel Nava, and J. T. Snow (who, in the final years of his career, hit exclusively left-handed). As of the 2018 season, there were 48 active switch-hitters on MLB rosters. Five of the league's 30 teams did not have a switch hitter on their roster in 2018.

Switch-hitting pitchers are relatively rare. They include Mordecai Brown, Norm Charlton, Marvin Rotblatt, Sid Monge, Johnny Vander Meer, J.C. Romero, Kyle Snyder, Wandy Rodriguez, Troy Patton, Tim Dillard, Tyler Johnson, Carlos Zambrano, Dock Ellis, Vida Blue, Anthony Claggett, Kris Medlen, Justin De Fratus, Drew Storen, Kenley Jansen, Derek Holland, Pat Neshek, Adam Ottavino, and Dylan Bundy. Joaquín Andújar sometimes hit right-handed against lefties, sometimes left-handed. Tomo Ohka batted left-handed against right-handed pitchers in three games in 2006, but otherwise batted exclusively right-handed. Left-handed reliever Steve Kline was primarily a switch hitter, but batted right-handed against right-handed pitchers several times throughout his career.

Management also had a say in the switch-hitting careers of Bob Gibson and Dwight Gooden. Both Gibson and Gooden—each right-handed, and a fine hitting pitcher—had reached the major leagues as a switch-hitter, but both their teams required them to bat only right-handed to reduce the possibility of their pitching arms being hit by a pitch.

Switch pitchers 

Pat Venditte, who played college baseball for the Creighton Bluejays, regularly pitched with both arms.  Venditte, drafted by the New York Yankees in 2008, was called up to the Oakland Athletics' major-league roster in 2015. When he opposed switch-hitter Ralph Henriquez while in the minor leagues, Venditte switched his modified glove to his left arm. Henriquez then switched to batting left-handed, and a series of changes continued for several minutes. This prompted the PBUC (Professional Baseball Umpire Corporation) to issue rules about switch-pitching: switch-pitchers must choose which way they will begin pitching before they start. Then, batters will select the side of home plate from which they will hit. The batter and the pitcher are each allowed one switch during the plate appearance, after the first pitch is thrown.

Notable switch hitters
 Roger Connor - All-time home run champion before Babe Ruth. 
 Mickey Mantle – The all-time home run leader among switch-hitters, a first-ballot Hall of Famer, and one of the greatest players ever.
 Chipper Jones – Also a first-ballot Hall of Famer, and the most recent of only two switch-hitters with extended MLB careers (5,000 at-bats or more) to have a career batting average of .300 from each side of home plate.
 Eddie Murray – Hall of Famer and the only other switch-hitter (apart from Mantle) with 500 career homers. Also, is one of two switch hitters (Pete Rose being the other) with 3,000 or more hits.
 Frankie Frisch – Another Hall of Famer, and the only other switch-hitter with an extended career to hit .300 from each side of home plate.
 Pete Rose – The all-time career hits leader in MLB. Currently barred from Hall of Fame consideration due to his betting on baseball.
 Bill Mueller - Only player in MLB history to hit a grand slam from each side of the plate in the same game.
 Jimmy Rollins - Phillies all-time career leader in hits and doubles, 2007 National League MVP and Silver Slugger, 3 time All-Star and 4 time Gold Glover

In boxing and mixed martial arts

In boxing and mixed martial arts, switch-hitting refers to the ability to change boxing stances mid-fight between an orthodox stance (Right-handed preference straight and left-handed preference jab) and a southpaw stance (Left-handed preference straight and right-handed preference jab).

See also
 Ambidexterity
 Switch hit (Cricket)
 Switch pitcher

References

Batting (baseball)
Handedness in baseball
Baseball terminology